Big Brother 2014, also known as Big Brother 15 and Big Brother: Power Trip,  was the fifteenth series of the British reality television series Big Brother, hosted by Emma Willis and narrated by Marcus Bentley. It began on 5 June 2014 on Channel 5 and lasted for 72 days ending on 15 August 2014, making it the longest series to air on Channel 5. It was the fourth regular series and the tenth series of Big Brother overall to air on the channel. The series was officially confirmed on 3 April 2012 when Channel 5 renewed the show until 2014. It was therefore the final regular series to be included under the then contract.

The series was controversially won by Helen Wood who won the £100,000 prize fund beating bookies' favourite Ashleigh Coyle by a margin of 4,631 votes. Wood became the first woman to win the competition since the show's inception on Channel 5. It was then revealed that just 1.2% of the vote, separated Helen and Ashleigh, making it one of the closest results in Big Brother history. This was the first, and currently only, series of Big Brother UK where both the runner-up and the winner were women.

Wood would later return the following year in Big Brother 16 as part of a secret twist that saw her and two other "legendary" former Housemates, Brian Belo and Nikki Grahame, re-enter the House as part of "Time Warp" week. In addition, Mark Byron and Matthew Davies also made an appearance in a shopping task.

Production

Auditions
Auditions for the series opened on 19 August 2013, the same day as the final of Big Brother 14. Like the previous series, there were no open auditions. Housemates were chosen from online applications. In order to become a housemate, applicants were required to record a 90-second video and complete an online application form.

Presenters
Emma Willis returned as the main presenter of the show. She also continued to present Big Brother's Bit on the Side, along with Celebrity Big Brother 11 winner Rylan Clark and Iain Lee. Celebrity Big Brother 13 housemate Luisa Zissman acted as a regular panellist on the show. Matt Johnson guest hosted an episode of Bit on the Psych in July.

Format
The fifteenth series of the show introduced several changes to the format, with the theme of the series being "Power Trip". This gives housemates who hold power influence over events in the house. An insider said, "This year Big Brother is offering housemates the ultimate prize... Power! Whoever has the power will be able to influence, twist and control events in the house like never before in Big Brother: Power Trip. Big Brother: Power Trip will initiate on launch night with Emma Willis and it will dominate the house for the summer. Housemates will have to be ruthless to seize power, keep it and impose their will on the rest of the house. The housemates aren’t the only ones – viewers will also be given the power to manipulate housemates throughout the series."

Eye logo
The official eye logo was unveiled by Channel 5 on 9 May 2014. It had a futuristic look, which coincided with the futuristic themed house.

House
On 16 May 2014, it was announced that the house would be given a futuristic makeover. "The house has been given a futuristic makeover – renovated and redesigned to feature stark open spaces, sleek, clean lines and technology instead of the sumptuous furnishings and ornate decorations from the last home." Official house pictures were released on 2 June 2014. The new house had a dark, futuristic design with each area featuring its own monitor. Similar to the previous series, the Diary Room was at the top of the stairs. However the layout for the house remained almost identical to Big Brother 14, except for the bedroom, which was located where the Safe House was, and the bathroom, which replaced the bedroom. The bedroom included eight narrowly shaped double beds as well as a walk-in wardrobe for housemates to store their belongings. In the garden, the Treehouse was replaced by a spiral staircase leading to a "Gogglebox" pod where housemates could spy on each other. The garden also featured a large circular pool and a smoking area. Geometric heads were a common theme within the house as they served as ornaments, containers and planters.

A new addition to the House in the series was the Control Room, which was used as part of the series' Power theme. The Housemate who was equipped with the Power was able to access the Control Room and view various information about the other Housemates, such as their VTs, Diary Room entries and public opinions of them, in order to inform their decisions as the Power Housemate. The Control Room was occupied by a computerised female voice known as Iris, who communicated with the Power Housemate and talked them through their options.

Teasers
On 9 May 2014, Channel 5 released the first 10-second teaser for the new series hinting at the "Power" theme and also featured the new eye logo. On 16 May 2014, a second teaser was released confirming the new title for the series – Big Brother: Power Trip. A minute-long trailer confirming the new series title was revealed on 22 May 2014. The advert also featured Willis and Clark. The official countdown adverts began airing on 29 May 2014 with just seven days to go before the launch.

Sponsorship
SuperCasino remained the headline sponsor to the show after renewing their contract. The new contract covers both the fifteenth regular series and the fourteenth edition of Celebrity Big Brother, which will air three days afterwards. The deal marked the first time since 2011 that a summer sponsor of Big Brother has renewed their deal for a second term.

Housemates

On Day 1, 10 housemates entered the house, and a further 6 entered on Day 2. On Day 40, 3 new housemates entered. Overall, this brings the total housemates that have participated in this series to 19 (the most since the show moved to Channel 5).

Power Housemate
The Power Housemate is responsible for making important decisions in the house regarding nominations. The Power Housemate is immune from being nominated for the week they hold the title, but they can still nominate others.
 On Day 1, Pauline was voted as the Power Housemate by the public just moments after entering the house. Her first big decision was to decide which housemate should be punished, and which should be rewarded based on first impressions. Respectively, she punished Matthew and rewarded Mark. Her next big decision came on Day 2 where she had to decide which of her housemates should be rewarded a pass to the final. She chose Helen. Pauline's final Power Housemate decision came on Day 4 where she was told to give someone a Killer Nomination. This meant that whoever received this would face eviction every week they remain in the house. She chose Jale. Pauline's reign of Power Housemate ended after the reveal of the Killer Nomination on Day 4.
 On Day 8, the public voted Chris as the next Power Housemate however his identity remained a secret to the remaining housemates. Instead, over the days he was Power Housemate he had to decide five housemates to nominate. His first and second nomination came on Day 9 after the first eviction where he chose Pauline and Christopher. His third nomination was Steven on Day 10, followed by Ash on Day 11. Chris' final nomination was Marlon on Day 12, and his Power Housemate status was never revealed to the house.
 On Day 15, the housemates voted for who they wanted to become their next Power Housemate. As Ash, Christopher, Jale, Marlon, Pauline and Steven were nominated, they could not be chosen. The housemates chose Toya and the results were revealed to the house on Day 16 after the eviction. Toya's first decision was to choose someone else to be Power Housemate with her and be part of the Power Couple. She chose Matthew. They then had to decide as a pair who would definitely face the next eviction. They chose Christopher. On Day 17, they were told they could veto three housemates' nominations. They chose Ash, Marlon and Steven and unknowingly saved Kimberly from eviction. However a further twist took place on Day 18 as Matthew and Toya were asked to save a nominated housemate from eviction. After choosing Steven, he was then asked to choose one of Power Couple Matthew and Toya to be his replacement. He chose Toya, meaning she would face eviction.
 On Day 23, it was announced that the girls – Ashleigh, Danielle, Helen, Jale and Kimberly – would become Girl Power and that all of the boys would face eviction. Despite Jale being the holder of the Killer Nomination, she was immune from eviction this week along with the other girls. On Day 26, the girls chose to save Chris, Marlon and Steven from eviction.
 On Day 40, the three new housemates – Biannca, Pav and Zoe – were told that they would have the power to choose one original housemate to be evicted. This power had to remain secret from the other housemates. However, unbeknownst to them, they also faced eviction as the public were voting for who they wanted to stay. Biannca received the fewest votes so was evicted on Day 44 leaving the eviction decision down to Pav and Zoe. They chose to evict Danielle.
 On Day 46, the public selected Ashleigh as the next Power Housemate via a poll on the Big Brother app. The identity of Ashleigh as the Power Housemate was kept a secret from the other housemates. On Day 47, Ashleigh chose Chris to join her as Power Housemate, forming the Power Alliance. Ashleigh and Chris then nominated Steven before selecting Mark to join the Power Alliance. Later that day, the Power Alliance nominated Ash. On Day 48, the Power Alliance were allowed 60 seconds to speak to each of former housemates Biannca, Danielle and Matthew to receive advice on their next nominations. Following this, the Power Alliance nominated Pav and Zoe and their Power Trip ended. However, in a shock twist, Big Brother then revealed the Power Alliance to the house and gave nominated housemates the opportunity to save one of themselves from eviction and swap with a Power Alliance member. Ash was saved and replaced with Ashleigh.
 On Day 51, the power was given to the public as People Power. Their first decision was to decide which housemate should be immune from the next eviction by voting in a poll via the Big Brother app. The public chose Ashleigh. The next decision was which housemate should be in control of who gets their letters from home. This housemate was Winston. The public also played a role in this week's shopping task; 'Housemates vs the Internet'. Via the Big Brother app, the public had to choose which housemate was "most..." in a series of categories. Housemates then had to correctly identify who had received the most and fewest votes. On Day 57, housemates watched a focus group where members of the public gave their honest opinions on the housemates.
 On Day 58, it was revealed that housemates would be given the opportunity to increase the prize fund by £25,000 to a total of £125,000 in the Power of Money twist. This was revealed to the housemates on Day 61 immediately after face-to-face nominations. On Day 62, the first opportunity to add to the prize fund will take place as the remaining housemates eligible to face eviction will each choose an envelope, one containing £1,000, another containing £5,000 and the final containing £10,000. The already nominated housemate then chose one of the remaining housemates to join them in facing eviction, with the amount in their envelope being added to the overall prize fund. Chris was chosen, with £10,000 being added to the fund. Ash and Winston were also be given the chance to add £1,000 to the prize fund each by entering Helen's Salon. After making mistakes whilst cutting Christopher and Mark's hair in the past, Helen will be given the opportunity to cut Ash and Winston's in the same way if they choose to accept. They refused, therefore no more money was added. The next chance to add to the prize fund was given to the housemates that did not receive their letters from home; Chris, Christopher and Mark as they were to be told they can spend time with one of their family members. Before spending time with them, they were given £6,000 towards the fund, but were told for every second they spend with their loved ones, the money will go down by £20. All three drained the money therefore no more was added to the fund. A further £500 was added to the fund after some housemates drank a stinky tofu cocktail. On Day 63, Mark missed out on £1,500 after he failed his psychic powers task, predicting the wrong bowl a meerkat would eat out of. However, the housemates then banked a further £5,000 by unlocking a vault by identifying what housemates said about them from the quotes read out to them. The public then voted for who they thought was the best judge of character. They chose Ashleigh. For the last part of the Power of Money twist, all housemates except Ashleigh were told they had been selected by the public to face a dilemma: take the banked £15,500 for themselves, or leave it for the winner. However this was a lie, but Ash, Chris and Mark all said they would take the money. Ashleigh's role in the task was then revealed as she had to predict the three housemates who said they would take it. As she failed the predict all three, she failed the task and lost the extra money meaning the prize fund stayed at £100,000.
 On Day 68, in the Power of Knowledge, the Power returned for the final time, this time to Ash and Christopher. These were selected by Big Brother as they are the only housemates who have not been Power Housemate before. Their first mission was to choose two questions for Big Brother to ask the other housemates in the Diary Room. Following Helen's "surprise eviction" on Day 69, Ash and Christopher were then given the power to evict one more housemate. They chose Chris. However, unbeknownst to them and the other housemates, Chris and Helen had not really been evicted and were actually living in Big Brother's Spare Room. In the Spare Room they were able to watch the other housemates' every move. Chris and Helen returned to the house on Day 69.

 Colour key
 Won the title of Power Housemate
 Eligible to become Power Housemate
 Not in the house at the time when the Power Housemate was decided
 Was not eligible to become Power Housemate

Weekly summary
The main events in the Big Brother 15 house are summarised in the table below. A typical week began with nominations, followed by the shopping task, and then the eviction of a housemate during the live Friday episode. Evictions, tasks, and other events for a particular week are noted in order of sequence.

Nominations table

Notes

 :  This housemate was the current Power Housemate and could not be nominated for eviction through the standard nomination process that week. Despite not being able to be nominated, in some cases, Power Housemates could face the public vote and be evicted, see note 4 & note 8.
 : On Day 2, Power Housemate Pauline granted Helen a pass to the final, granting her immunity from every eviction of the series and therefore could not be nominated by her fellow housemates. On Day 4, as housemates nominated for the first time, Pauline was told she’d make one Killer Nomination and that whoever she chose would automatically face every eviction of the series until they were evicted. Pauline decided to give the Killer Nomination to Jale, meaning she also could not be nominated by her fellow housemates in following weeks.
 : On Day 9, Big Brother announced that this week's nominations were cancelled and only the secret Power Housemate, Chris, was eligible to nominate. Chris nominated Pauline and Christopher on Day 9, Steven on Day 10, Ash on Day 11, and Marlon on Day 12. On Day 15, Big Brother announced that Housemates would be choosing the next Power Housemate. All Housemates were eligible to receive the power except for those who were currently facing the public vote.
 : Toya was voted the Power Housemate by the group on Day 16, and she chose Matthew to join her in forming the Power Couple. Together they picked Christopher to automatically face the third eviction. All other housemates later nominated as normal, but before they did, Toya and Matthew had the chance to cancel three housemates’ nominations. They chose Ash, Marlon and Steven. Had this not happened Kimberly would have also faced the public vote. On Day 18, Toya and Matthew were able to save one of the nominees (excluding Christopher and Jale). They chose Steven, who in return had to put either Toya or Matthew up for eviction. He chose Toya.
 : After Toya's eviction, Big Brother announced Girl Power, with the female housemates getting control of the house and immunity for the week. As a result of this, Jale was given a one-week reprieve from her Killer Nomination and all male housemates were automatically put up for eviction. Before the lines opened, the girls were allowed to save three of the boys. They saved Chris, Marlon and Steven.
 : Marlon was originally nominated alongside Ashleigh, Chris, Christopher and Jale, however he won safety in the Battery Power shopping task meaning he no longer faced eviction.
 : On Day 39, housemates nominated as normal, unaware that as part of "Armageddon Week" the housemate who received the most nominations would be instantly evicted the next day. Marlon received the most nominations (7 out of a possible 10 nominations) and was therefore evicted.
 : Unbeknownst to them, new housemates Biannca, Pav and Zoe all faced the public vote this week. Unlike previous weeks, this week was a vote to save.
 : After Marlon's eviction, Big Brother told the rest of the housemates that they all faced the public vote this week. In reality, Big Brother handed the power to the new housemates, who had to decide whom to evict. As Helen had a free pass to the final, she could not be chosen. Kimberly also could not be chosen as she temporarily left the house on Day 44 due to an illness. Following Biannca's eviction, Pav and Zoe had 30 seconds to decide who to evict, and they unanimously decided to evict Danielle.
 : On Day 46, Ashleigh was chosen by the public to become the next Power Housemate. On Day 47, she chose Chris to join her in forming a Power Alliance. Together they decided to nominate Steven and selected Mark to join the Alliance, which then nominated Ash. On Day 48, the Power Alliance nominated Pav and Zoe. In a further twist, the nominated housemates were told to decide between them which of them should be saved from eviction and which of the Power Alliance to replace themselves with. The nominated housemates decided to save Ash from eviction and replaced him with Ashleigh.
 : On Day 51, the power was given to the public. Via the Big Brother app, the public voted for Ashleigh to be immune from eviction this week and therefore, she could not be nominated.
 : On Day 61, housemates nominated face-to-face. On Day 62, as part of Big Brother's "Power of Money" scheme, the remaining housemates eligible to face the public vote (Ash, Ashleigh and Chris) each chose an envelope: one containing £1,000, another containing £5,000, and the final containing £10,000. The already nominated housemates had to choose one of the remaining housemates to join them in facing eviction, with the amount in their envelope supposedly added to the prize fund. They chose Chris, and £10,000 was added to the fund (although all the money won in the Power of Money was not put in the prize fund as Ashleigh failed a task).
 : This week the public voted to win, rather than to evict. Whilst the public were voting to win, Helen and Chris were fake evicted on Day 68 and moved into the 'Spare Room', but they were still eligible to win. They returned to the house the following day.

Ratings and reception

Television ratings
Official ratings are taken from BARB.

Controversy and criticism
Ofcom received over 1,500 complaints for Helen Wood and Pauline Bennett bullying Jale Karaturp. Helen received a warning on Day 12 due to bullying Jale and Day 21 she received another warning due to using threatening behaviour to housemate Matthew Davies.

In Week 7, having become the latest Power Housemate, Ashleigh was told she would be exempt from this week’s public vote. After she joined forces with Chris and Mark to become the Power Alliance, which would exclusively decide who would face eviction, Channel 5 announced to the public that all members of the Power Alliance would be immune from eviction. Despite this, on Day 48 the Power Alliance twist came to an end with Ashleigh being put up for eviction. Big Brother fans responded furiously to the news, accusing show bosses of lying and misleading both the housemates and the public. However, the broadcaster declined the opportunity to explain the twist, instead answering simply: "No comment."

Shortly after his eviction, ex-housemate Steven Goode criticised the show for unhygienic living conditions within the house, complaining of food and dirty clothes being left lying around, and a general bad smell in the house. Goode also criticised the show's medical staff after it emerged that his lover, ex-housemate Kimberly Kisselovich, had suffered from an ectopic pregnancy, as a result of sexual intercourse with him in the house. The show's producers have responded to his complaints with the statement "Housemates' welfare is our main priority and we applied that to Kimberly."

On 8 September 2014 Ofcom announced that 3,820 complaints had been rejected for Big Brother, 489 of the complaints aimed towards the allegations of the final being rigged in Helen's favour. Despite all this Ofcom also announced that an investigation will take place of the episode airing on 7 August 2014 which was Day 64 over the broadcast of offensive language before watershed. An Ofcom spokesperson said; "Ofcom is currently investigating the broadcast of offensive language before the watershed in an episode of Big Brother on August 7th. After carefully assessing viewer complaints about the rest of the series, Ofcom did not consider they raised issues warranting investigation under our rules."

References

External links
 Official website 
 

2014 British television seasons
15
Channel 5 (British TV channel) reality television shows